Quaddick State Park is a public recreation area located on  Middle Quaddick Reservoir in the town of Thompson, Connecticut. The state park is managed by the Connecticut Department of Energy and Environmental Protection and offers opportunities for boating, swimming, fishing, and picnicking.

History
The park was originally developed as a forest recreation area as part of  Quaddick State Forest. It was split off as a state park in 1951. Prior to its use for public recreation, the park, which is located on Town Farm Road and crossed by Poor Farm Brook, had been the site of Thompson's town farm, where indigent and elderly residents were taken care of by the local government.

Activities and amenities
In addition to a swimming beach and picnicking facilities, the park offers a boat ramp and a one-and-half-mile circular trail for hikers.

References

External links
Quaddick State Park Connecticut Department of Energy and Environmental Protection
Quaddick State Park Map Connecticut Department of Energy and Environmental Protection

State parks of Connecticut
Parks in Windham County, Connecticut
Thompson, Connecticut
Protected areas established in 1951
1951 establishments in Connecticut